Rudolf Reichling (23 September 1924 – 23 November 2014) was a Swiss politician and President of the Swiss National Council (1987/1988). As a rower, Reichling competed in the 1948 Summer Olympics. He was a crew member of the Swiss boat which won the silver medal in the coxed fours event. His father Rudolf Reichling (1890-1977) had presided over the National Council in 1936/1937.

External links
 Rudolf Reichling's profile at Sports Reference.com
 
 

1924 births
2014 deaths
Swiss male rowers
Olympic rowers of Switzerland
Rowers at the 1948 Summer Olympics
Olympic silver medalists for Switzerland
Olympic medalists in rowing
Members of the National Council (Switzerland)
Presidents of the National Council (Switzerland)
Medalists at the 1948 Summer Olympics